Dammarie may refer to the following communes in France:

Dammarie, Eure-et-Loir, in the Eure-et-Loir département
Dammarie-en-Puisaye, in the Loiret département
Dammarie-les-Lys, in the Seine-et-Marne département 
Dammarie-sur-Loing, in the Loiret département 
Dammarie-sur-Saulx, in the Meuse département

See also

Dame-Marie (disambiguation)